These are the results of the men's floor competition, one of eight events for male competitors in artistic gymnastics at the 1972 Summer Olympics in Munich.  The qualification and final rounds took place on August 27, 29 and September 1 at the Sports Hall.

Results

Qualification

One-hundred thirteen gymnasts competed in the compulsory and optional rounds on August 27 and 29.  The six highest scoring gymnasts advanced to the final on ___.

Final

References
Official Olympic Report
www.gymnasticsresults.com
www.gymn-forum.net

Men's floor